Anke Möhring (born 28 August 1969 in Magdeburg, Bezirk Magdeburg) is a former freestyle swimmer from East Germany, who won the bronze medal in the 400 m freestyle at the 1988 Summer Olympics in Seoul, South Korea. She was named Swimming World's European Swimmers of the Year in 1989.

See also
 List of German records in swimming

References
  databaseOlympics

1969 births
Living people
Sportspeople from Magdeburg
People from Bezirk Magdeburg
East German female freestyle swimmers
Olympic swimmers of East Germany
Swimmers at the 1988 Summer Olympics
Olympic bronze medalists for East Germany
World record setters in swimming
Olympic bronze medalists in swimming
European Aquatics Championships medalists in swimming
Medalists at the 1988 Summer Olympics
Recipients of the Patriotic Order of Merit in bronze